was a Japanese painter, noted for his work in developing Romanticism and impressionism within the yōga (Western-style) art movement in late 19th- and early 20th-century Japanese painting. In his later years, he was influenced by the Art Nouveau movement.

Biography
Fujishima was born to an ex-samurai class household in Kagoshima, Satsuma Domain in southern Kyūshū, Japan, where his father had been a retainer of the Shimazu clan daimyō. After studying art at Kagoshima Middle School he left home in 1884 to pursue his studies in Tokyo, first with Kawabata Gyokusho, a Shijō school nihonga artist. However, Fujishima was attracted to the new western-style oil painting techniques, and switched to yōga-style painting, which he learned under Yamamoto Hōsui and Soyama Yukihiro. His graduation piece, “Cruelty” was exhibited at the 3rd Meiji Art Association Exhibition in 1891, where it was viewed by noted novelist and art critic Mori Ōgai.

Fujishima moved to Tsu in Mie Prefecture in 1893, where he was an assistant teacher at the Mie Prefectural Elementary School, but soon returned to Tokyo in 1896 under the sponsorship of Kuroda Seiki to become an assistant professor at the Tokyo Art School's Western Painting Department. He also joined Kuroda’s art coterie, the Hakubakai (White Horse Society). 

Travelling to France in 1905, Fujishima studied the techniques of historical painting under Fernand Cormon at the École nationale supérieure des Beaux-Arts in Paris, and portraiture under Carolus-Duran at the French Academy in Rome in Italy. He returned to Japan in 1910 and became a professor at the Tokyo Art School and a member of the Imperial Art Academy. In 1937, he was one of the first recipients of the newly created Order of Culture of  the Japanese government.

Fujishima died in 1943; his grave is at the Aoyama Cemetery, in Tokyo.

Noted works
, 1904, Private Collection, National Important Cultural Property
, 1909, Bridgestone Museum of Art 
, 1902, Ishibashi Art Museum,  National Important Cultural Property
 Sunrise over the Eastern Sea, 1932

Notes

References
 Keene, Donald. Dawn to the West. Columbia University Press; (1998). 
 Mason, Penelope. History of Japanese Art . Prentice Hall (2005). 
 Sadao, Tsuneko. Discovering the Arts of Japan: A Historical Overview. Kodansha International (2003). 
 Schaarschmidt-Richter, Irmtraud. Japanese Modern Art Painting From 1910 . Edition Stemmle. 
 Weisenfeld, Gennifer. MAVO: Japanese Artists and the Avant-Garde, 1905-1931. University of California Press (2001).

External links

 Marubeni Museum of Art 
Bridgestone Art Museum
Mie Prefectural Museum

1867 births
1943 deaths
Art Nouveau painters
Impressionist painters
People from Kagoshima
Yōga painters
19th-century Japanese painters
20th-century Japanese painters
École des Beaux-Arts alumni
Recipients of the Order of Culture
Imperial household artists